The 1896 Calgary municipal election was scheduled for December 14, 1896 to elect a Mayor and nine Councillors to sit on the thirteenth Calgary City Council from January 4, 1897 to January 3, 1898.

The entire council was acclaimed upon the close of nominations on December 7, 1896.

Background
Voting rights were provided to any male, single woman, or widowed British subject over twenty-one years of age who are assessed on the last revised assessment roll with a minimum property value of $200.

The election was held under multiple non-transferable vote where each elector was able to cast a ballot for the mayor and up to three ballots for separate councillors.

Results

Mayor
Wesley Fletcher Orr

Councillors

Ward 1
William Pitman Jr.
William Mahon Parslow
Silas Alexander Ramsay

Ward 2
Arthur Leslie Cameron
Neville James Lindsay
Henry Brown

Ward 3
Thomas Underwood
Adam Robson McTavish
Walter Jarrett

See also
List of Calgary municipal elections

References

Sources
Frederick Hunter: THE MAYORS AND COUNCILS  OF  THE CORPORATION OF CALGARY Archived March 3, 2020

Municipal elections in Calgary
1896 elections in Canada
1890s in Calgary